Judith and Holofernes is a painting of  in oils on canvas by the studio of Jacopo Tintoretto; it was previously considered to be an autograph work from the painter's youth. Previously owned by the Marquis of La Ensenada, it entered the Spanish royal collection in 1760 and is now in the Museo del Prado.

References

Paintings of the Museo del Prado by Italian artists
1577 paintings
Tintoretto